Mark Igorevich Karymov (born 22 June 1998) is a Russian football player.

Club career
He made his Russian Premier League debut for FC Tom Tomsk on 3 March 2017 in a game against FC Rostov.

References

External links
 

1998 births
Sportspeople from Tomsk
Living people
Russian footballers
FC Tom Tomsk players
Russian Premier League players
Association football defenders